Stig B. Hagström (1932–2011) was a Professor Emeritus of Materials Science and Engineering at Stanford University.

Career
He was trained at Uppsala University under the Nobel Laureate Kai Siegbahn. He received his B.Sc. (filosofie kandidat) in 1957, his M.Sc. (filosofie magister) in 1958, his licentiate (filosofie licentiat) in 1961 and his Ph.D. in 1964. After a period in 1964–1966 as a researcher at Massachusetts Institute of Technology and Lawrence Berkeley Laboratory, he was appointed university lecturer (universitetslektor) and docent at Chalmers University of Technology in 1966. In 1969 he was appointed as a chaired full professor in Physics and vice chancellor at Linköping Institute of Technology, which was founded the very same year, and which received full university status in 1975 and thus became Linköping University, Sweden's sixth university. Thereafter he moved to Xerox Palo Alto Research Center in California, US. In 1987 he was appointed professor at Stanford University. In 1992–1998 he was the chancellor of the Swedish National Agency for Higher Education.

Awards
 Member of the Royal Swedish Academy of Engineering Sciences (1983)
 Honorary Member of the Royal Swedish Academy of Engineering Sciences (1999)
 Member of the Royal Swedish Academy of Sciences (1992)
 Member of the Royal Norwegian Society of Sciences and Letters
 Member of Royal Physiographic Society in Lund
 Fellow of the American Physical Society
 Honorary Doctorate in Engineering, Linköping University
 Honorary Doctorate in Engineering, Blekinge Institute of Technology
 Knight of the Order of the Polar Star
 Recipient of the Royal Order of the Seraphim, a Swedish Royal Order of Chivalry created in 1748
 Royal Swedish Medal
 John Ericsson Gold Medal

References

Stanford University School of Engineering faculty
Academic staff of Linköping University
Uppsala University alumni
Members of the Royal Swedish Academy of Engineering Sciences
Members of the Royal Swedish Academy of Sciences
Members of the Royal Physiographic Society in Lund
1932 births
2011 deaths